Gladiolus carmineus is a perennial plant belonging to the genus Gladiolus and is part of the fynbos. The plant is native to the Western Cape and occurs from Cape Hangklip to Cape Infanta. The plant has an occurrence area of ​​less than 20 km2 and is threatened by development on the coast.

Gallery

External links 
 Threatened Species Programme | SANBI Red List of South African Plants
 Gladiolus carmineus C.H.Wright | Plants of the World Online | Kew Science

carmineus